Katharina Truppe (born 15 January 1996) is an Austrian World Cup alpine ski racer. Born in Villach, Carinthia, she specializes in the technical events of slalom and giant slalom. Truppe made her World Cup debut in January 2015, and ascended her first podium in November 2019 at Levi, Finland.

World Cup results

Season standings

Race podiums
3 podiums (3 SL); 34 top tens

World Championship results

Olympic results

References

External links

Katharina Truppe at Austrian Ski team official site 
 

1996 births
Austrian female alpine skiers
Living people
Sportspeople from Villach
Alpine skiers at the 2022 Winter Olympics
Olympic alpine skiers of Austria
Medalists at the 2022 Winter Olympics
Olympic medalists in alpine skiing
Olympic gold medalists for Austria
20th-century Austrian women
21st-century Austrian women